Not to be confused with Bob Barker

Robert Baker may refer to:

Arts
 Robert Baker (actor) (born 1979), American actor known from Grey's Anatomy and Out of Time
 Robert Hart Baker (born 1954), American conductor and music director
 Robert S. Baker (1916–2009), British television and film producer, best known for producing The Saint
 Bob Baker (scriptwriter) (1939–2021), British writer
 Rob Baker (Ghostwriter), a character in the American TV series Ghostwriter
 Rob Baker (guitarist) (born 1962), Canadian guitarist with the band The Tragically Hip
 Bobby Baker (artist) (born 1950), British multi-disciplinary artist and activist

Sports
 Robert Baker (cricketer) (1849–1896), British player for Yorkshire County Cricket Club
 Robert Baker (gridiron football) (born 1976), former American professional football player in the US and Canada
 Robert Baker (ice hockey) (1926–2012), American ice hockey player
 Bob Baker (boxer) (1926–2002), American heavyweight
 Bobby Baker (racing driver), American driver
 Rob Baker (cricketer) (born 1975), Australian player for Western Australia

Political figures 
 Robert Baker (New York politician) (1862–1943), U.S. Representative from New York (1903–1905)
 Robert Hall Baker (1839–1882), school commissioner, alderman, mayor, senator from Wisconsin (1872–1876), and businessman
 Bobby Baker (1928–2017), American political adviser of Lyndon B. Johnson

Others
 Robert Baker (explorer), English voyager to Guinea in 1562–1563
 Robert Baker (scientist) (1938–2004), English metallurgist and steelmaker
 Robert A. Baker (1921–2005), American psychologist, professor at University of Kentucky
 Robert C. Baker (1921–2006), American inventor of the "chicken nugget", professor at Cornell University
 Robert Hoapili Baker (1847–1900), Hawaiian colonel and governor
 Robert Horace Baker (1883–1964), American astronomer
 Robert Joseph Baker (born 1944), Roman Catholic bishop of Birmingham, Alabama
 Robert M. L. Baker Jr. (born 1930), American physicist
 Robert Symington Baker (1826–1894), American businessman and landowner
 Robert James Baker (1942–2018), American mammalogist
 Robert Baker (gunsmith), allegedly invented Daniel Boone's gun, the Long Rifle

See also
 Bob Baker (disambiguation)
 Bert Baker (disambiguation)
 Robert T. Bakker (born 1945), American paleontologist (pronounced "Backer")
 Robert Baker Aitken (1917–2010), American Zen teacher
 James Robert Baker (1947–1997), American author
 Robert Baker Girdlestone (1836–1923), English priest, scholar, and first principal of Wycliffe Hall, Oxford